The Face Shop (stylized as THE FACE SHOP) is a South Korea-based skincare and cosmetics manufacturer, retailer and a franchise business. It is a subsidiary of LG Household & Health Care of LG Corporation. Its products includes body, bath, skin care and make-up aimed at both women and men. Its headquarters is in the LG Gwanghwamun Building in Jongno-gu, Seoul.

History
The Face Shop was launched in 1947 with one store in Myeongdong. The company's marketing is largely based on natural products. The CEO of 'TheFaceShop Co., Ltd.' is Jeong Un-ho. It opened its 100th store in June 2004 and became the third largest cosmetics company in South Korea in December 2005. It continued to expand and entered the overseas market opening its 100th store in April 2006 and flagship store in Beijing in March 2008. There are stores in countries including Australia, Brunei, Cambodia, Canada, China, the Dominican Republic, India, Indonesia, Japan, Jordan, Malaysia, Mongolia, the Philippines, Singapore, Sri Lanka, Taiwan, Thailand, UAE, United States, Costa Rica, and Vietnam. As of April 2012, it has 930 stores in 24 countries.

In November 2009, the company was bought by LG Household & Health Care and became a subsidiary in January 2010. LG purchased a 90 percent stake with 70.2 percent from the biggest shareholder, Shepherd Detachering B.V., and 19.8 percent of the 29.8 percent from founder and president Jung Woon-ho. In 2014, the company bought the American bath and body line Fruits and Passion, and eventually most locations of Fruits and Passion were converted into The Face Shop.

Products
The Face Shop products range from makeup, skin care, hair&body, nail and men care products; such as Hydro Splash BB Cream, Extreme Volume Mascara-Lash Stretch, Gel Eyeliner, and Natural Sun SPF 45.

In popular culture
In August 2012, as part of Lotte Department Store's expansion programme into China, a replica of Seoul’s main shopping district Myeongdong is featured in its new store in Tianjin, with outlets of Missha, The Face Shop and Skin Food.

Actor Bae Yong-joon was the primary spokesperson in Korea and had appeared in a variety of advertisements. Kim Hyun-joong of SS501 has since 2010 been the official model for the brand, together with Seohyun of Girls’ Generation. Kim is the official international ambassador of the brand while Seohyun being the nationwide ambassador.

In 2013, Suzy of miss A joined as the new official international ambassador of the brand alongside Seohyun. In early 2014, Kim Soo-hyun joined the brand as the new ambassador in Asian countries (except for South Korea, Japan, and Hong Kong).

International

In 2007, The Face Shop opened its first stores in the USA in the San Francisco Bay Area and the west coast.  To search for spokesmodels for their USA division, they hosted the "Natural Beauty Contest".  The grand prize was over $20,000 in cash and prizes for the winners as well as a 1-year contract as The Face Shop USA spokesmodel. Hundreds of applicants were narrowed to 80 models for Round 1. The final round of 34 finalists yielded six winners. The Face Shop products can now be found in The Face Shop stores and Walgreens across the United States.

Images

See also 
 Shopping in Seoul
 List of South Korean retail companies

References

Cosmetics brands of South Korea
Cosmetics companies of South Korea
LG Corporation
Companies based in Seoul
Retail companies established in 1947
South Korean brands
Skin care brands
South Korean companies established in 1947
Manufacturing companies established in 1947